Luiz Henrique Byron de Mello (born 25 February 1949), known as just Luiz Henrique, is a Brazilian footballer. He competed in the men's tournament at the 1968 Summer Olympics.

References

External links
 

1949 births
Living people
Brazilian footballers
Brazil international footballers
Olympic footballers of Brazil
Footballers at the 1968 Summer Olympics
Footballers from Rio de Janeiro (city)
Association footballers not categorized by position